The Reality of the Virtual is a 2004 documentary film lecture by Slovenian philosopher Slavoj Žižek. Recorded in a single day by Ben Wright, the film consists of seven long takes of Žižek seated in front of a bookshelf. The discourse concerns the concept of "real effects produced, generated, by something which does not yet fully exist, which is not yet fully actual", with numerous examples from psychoanalysis, politics, sociology, physics and popular culture.

See also
Žižek!
The Pervert's Guide to Cinema
The Pervert's Guide to Ideology
Liebe Dein Symptom wie Dich selbst!
Examined Life
Marx Reloaded
Jacques Lacan
Virtuality (philosophy)

References

External links

2004 films
Documentary films about psychology
Documentary films about Slavoj Žižek
British documentary films
2004 documentary films
Films shot in London
2000s English-language films
2000s British films